A rubber band (also known as an elastic band, gum band or lacky band) is a loop of rubber, usually ring or oval shaped, and commonly used to hold multiple objects together. The rubber band was patented in England on March 17, 1845, by Stephen Perry. Most rubber bands are manufactured out of natural rubber or, especially at larger sizes, an elastomer, and are sold in a variety of sizes.

Notable developments in the evolution of rubber bands began in 1923 when William H. Spencer obtained a few Goodyear inner tubes and cut the bands by hand in his basement, where he founded Alliance Rubber Company. Spencer persuaded the Akron Beacon Journal as well as the Tulsa World to try wrapping their newspapers with one of his rubber bands to prevent them from blowing across lawns. He went on to pioneer other new markets for rubber bands such as: agricultural and industrial applications and a myriad of other uses. Spencer obtained a patent on February 19, 1957, for a new "Method for Making Elastic Bands" which produced rubber bands in an Open Ring design.

Manufacturing
Most probably, rubber, whether it is natural or synthetic, arrives at the manufacturing facility in large bales. Rubber bands are made by extruding the rubber into a long tube to provide its general shape. There are a number of different methods that can be applied at this point in the manufacturing process. Originally, and in some instances still today, the rubber tubes will then be placed on mandrels, curing the rubber with heat, and then slicing them across the width of the tube into little bands. This causes the tube to split into multiple sections, creating rubber bands. This is most commonly known as an "off-line" rubber extrusion process.

However, in 1969 the world's first continuous cure extrusion line for rubber bands was installed at the Alliance Rubber Company rubber band manufacturing facility in Alliance, OH, U.S.A. Rubber bands produced using this high speed continuous production equipment feature an improved modulus (stretch), a smoother, more consistent quality, and yield a higher count per pound. There is no need to use mandrels in this process. With the continuous cure process, the rubber is forced through the aperture or die, traveling in a continuous stream directly into and through a "curing tunnel" which uniformly raises the extrudite to the vulcanizing temperature and maintains it there for the entire curing or vulcanizing period. This is most commonly referred to as an "on-line" rubber extrusion process.

While other rubber products may use synthetic rubber, most rubber bands are primarily manufactured using natural rubber because of its superior elasticity.

Natural rubber originates from the latex of the rubber tree, which is acquired by tapping into the bark layers of the rubber tree. Rubber trees belong to the spurge family (Euphorbiaceae) and only survive in hot, humid tropical climates near the equator, so the majority of latex is produced in the Southeast Asian countries of Malaysia, Thailand, and Indonesia. Once the latex has been tapped and is exposed to the air, it begins to harden and become elastic, or rubbery.

Rubber band sizes

Measuring

A rubber band is usually measured in three basic dimensions: length, width, and thickness. Its length is defined as half its circumference. Its thickness is the distance from the inner surface to the outer surface, and its width is the distance from one cut edge to the other.

If one imagines a rubber band during manufacture, that is, a long tube of rubber on a mandrel, before it is sliced into rubber bands, the band's width is decided by how far apart the slices are cut, and its length by the circumference of the tube.

Size numbers

A rubber band is given a standard or quasi-standard number based on its dimensions.

Generally, rubber bands are numbered from smallest to largest, width first.
Thus, rubber bands numbered 8–19 are all  inch wide, with lengths going from  inch to  inches.
Rubber band numbers 30–35 are for width of  inch, going again from shorter to longer.
For even longer bands, the numbering starts over for numbers above 100, again starting at width  inch.

The origin of these size numbers is not clear. For the most part, the most widely accepted size numbers can be found on rubberband.com using their Standard Line Specifications Chart.

{| class="wikitable"
|+Rubber band sizes
| Size
| Length (in)
| Width (in)
| Thickness (in)
|-
| 10
| 
| 
| 
|-
| 12
| 
| 
| 
|-
| 14
| 2
| 
| 
|-
| 31
| 
| 
| 
|-
| 32
| 3
| 
| 
|-
| 33
| 
| 
| 
|-
| 61
| 2
| 
| 
|-
| 62
| 
| 
| 
|-
| 63
| 3
| 
| 
|-
| 64
| 
| 
| 
|-
| 117
| 7
| 
| 
|-
|}

Thermodynamics

Temperature affects the elasticity of a rubber band in an unusual way. Heating causes the rubber band to contract and cooling causes expansion.
Stretching a rubber band will cause it to release heat, while releasing it after it has been stretched will make it absorb heat, causing its surroundings to become a little cooler. This effect is due to the higher entropy of the unstressed state, which is more entangled and therefore has more states available. In other words, the ability to convert thermal energy into work while the rubber relaxes is allowed by the higher entropy of the relaxed state.

The result is that a rubber band behaves somewhat like an ideal monatomic gas inasmuch as (to good approximation) that elastic polymers do not store any potential energy in stretched chemical bonds. No elastic work is done to "stretch" molecules when work is done upon these bulk polymers. Instead, all work done to the rubber is "released" (not stored) and appears immediately in the polymer as thermal energy. Conversely, when the polymer does work on the surroundings (such as contracting to lift an object) it converts thermal energy to work in the process and cools in the same manner as an ideal gas, expanding while doing work.

Red rubber bands

In the UK during 2004, following complaints from the public about postal carriers creating litter by discarding the rubber bands which they used to keep their mail together, the Royal Mail introduced red bands for their workers to use: it was hoped that, as the bands were easier to spot than the traditional brown ones and since only the Royal Mail used them, employees would see (and feel compelled to pick up) any red bands which they had inadvertently dropped. Currently, some 342 million red bands are used every year.
The Royal Mail no longer uses red rubber bands as of about 2010. The exact date is uncertain, presumably as different areas used up old stock at different rates.

Rubber bands in orthodontics
Special rubber bands of medical-grade latex can be used (worn) for orthodontic correction of teeth position together with metal braces or clear aligners to apply additional pressure on the teeth being straightened.  They are termed orthodontic elastics.

Ranger bands

This type of rubber band was popularized by use in the military. Ranger bands are essentially sections of tire inner tubing cut into various sizes. They have the advantage of being versatile, durable, and resistant to weather and abrasion. They are commonly used for lashings, and can also be used for makeshift handle grips, providing a strong high-friction surface with excellent shock absorption.

Identical loops of inner tube are used by cavers and cave divers, and in that context are called snoopy loops by the British caving and cave diving community. When they get lost they are recognizable as a common form of litter.

Snoopy loops are easily cut from discarded car and motorcycle inner tubes using a pair of scissors. A knife cut may leave a notched edge which can lead to tearing. Varying sizes of inner tube are used for different tasks. Uses in caving include sealing cuffs of oversuits and collars of boots against the ingress of water, holding kneepads and elbow pads in place or securing dive lines to small rocks. and have been used for first aid for strapping injured joints tightly in place.

Technical divers use small snoopy loops made from bicycle inner tubes to prevent backup lights clipped to a dive harness from dangling, and larger loops cut from car tubes are used to stow hoses against sling or sidemount cylinders.

The exact origin is unknown and has been subject to much speculation. The practice of using snoopy Loops has been claimed to have originated in Greece and spotted by Cave Diving Group members in the late 1970s. The practice was then propagated in Yorkshire Dales. Another claim is that snoopy loops were named by Dave Morris, a Cave Diving Group caver who noticed how they 'snooped' around boulders. It was considered a ridiculous name at the time. None of these claims are particularly plausible as the use is obvious and is likely to have originated independently in several places at earlier dates.

Elastration

In animal husbandry, rubber bands are used for docking and castration of livestock. The procedure involves banding the body part with a tight latex (rubber) band to restrict blood flow. As the blood flow diminishes, the cells within the gonads die and dehydrate. The part eventually drops off.

Model use
Rubber bands have long been one of the methods of powering small free-flight model aircraft, the rubber band being anchored at the rear of the fuselage and connected to the propeller at the front. To 'wind up' the 'engine', the propeller is repeatedly turned, twisting the rubber band. When the propeller has had enough turns, the propeller is released and the model launched, the rubber band then turning the propeller rapidly until it has unwound.

One of the first to use this method was pioneer aerodynamicist George Cayley, who used rubber band-driven motors for powering his small experimental models. These 'rubber motors' have also been used for powering small model boats.

Balls

A rubber band ball is a sphere of rubber bands made by using a knotted single band as a starting point and then wrapping rubber bands around the center until the desired size is achieved. The ball is usually made from 100% rubber bands, but some instructions call for using a marble, a crumpled piece of paper, or a ping-pong ball as a starting point.

Notable rubber band balls

The world's largest rubber band ball as of November 19, 2008, was created by Joel Waul of Lauderhill, Florida. He is currently the World Record Holder according to the Guinness World Records. It set the world record on November 13, 2008, in Lauderhill, Florida. The ball is now owned by Ripley's Believe it or Not!.

Steve Milton of Eugene, Oregon, previously held the record for the biggest rubber band ball beginning in 2006. During the construction of his rubber band ball, he was sponsored by OfficeMax, who sent him rubber bands to use for his ball. He began building the ball, with help from his family, in November, 2005 and would store the ball in their garage.

Before Steve Milton, the record was held by John Bain of Wilmington, Delaware, beginning in 1998. He put the ball up for auction in 2005, but he and his ball participated in Guinness World Records Day 2006. The bands were donated by two companies: Alliance Rubber and Textrip Ltd./Stretchwell Inc.

The former world record was set in 1978.

See also
 Hair tie
 Rainbow Loom
 Rubber band gun
 Silly Bandz

References

External links

1845 introductions
19th-century inventions
Caving equipment
Diving equipment
English inventions
Fasteners
Rubber products
Stationery